Jayden Hayward (born 11 February 1987) is a New Zealand-born rugby union player who played for the Italy national rugby union team and for Benetton Rugby. He can play as a fly-half, centre or fullback.

His rugby professional career began in New Zealand with Taranaki in 2008, before a move to the Western Force in 2013.

Domestic career
Aged only 20, Hayward was one of the break-out stars of the 2008 Air New Zealand Cup, his debut championship year for Taranaki, scoring three tries in eight appearances. In his first season of first division rugby, picked up two awards – for the most promising player of the year and for back of the year. Hayward's performance didn't go unnoticed by the national media or the Super 14 coaches. He received high praise from television, print and radio commentators. Hayward didn't play in the opening two games and only got his chance as a replacement against Tasman in Nelson. He made an immediate impact with his decisive running and ability to spot a gap. His ability to put a player into space also caught the eye. He finished the year as the first-choice second five-eighth.

After an impressive showing in the Air New Zealand Cup in 2008, Hayward was the second-youngest player (next to Israel Dagg) included on the Highlanders squad for the 2009 Super 14 season. He earned his first Super Rugby start in the Highlanders historic 6–0 victory over the Crusaders in Week 4 of the competition, and made a further 3 appearances as a substitute. In Taranaki, Hayward continued to be a key contributor, appearing in 13 matches and recording 2 tries.

He returned to the Highlanders for 2010, Hayward was given an opportunity to start the first two games of the season, but found himself out-of-favour as the season went along, making only 3 substitute appearances the rest of the way. He was one of the more consistent backs of the 2010 ITM Cup, playing every game for the amber and blacks and scored five tries. Hayward was also Top try-scorer for the side and was judged back of the year ahead of finalists Kurt Baker and David Smith.

Hayward was not brought back to the Highlanders for the 2011 Super 15 season, and instead signed on with the Hurricanes as a member of their wider training group. He was called up as a replacement for Ma’a Nonu who was serving a one-week suspension, but injuries elsewhere and compelling form made him a permanent squad member from that point on, and seven of his 11 appearances were in the starting XV. Playing his fourth consecutive ITM Cup season for Taranaki in 2011, Hayward broke a New Zealand first-class record – scoring a try in 10 consecutive matches. The run started against Hawke's Bay in September 2010 and ended when he failed to score against Bay of Plenty in August 2011. Nevertheless, there was a bigger prize at season's end; the Ranfurly Shield.

After playing his second Super Rugby season in 2012 with the Hurricanes and after 58 appearances for Taranaki, Hayward signed a two-year contract with the Western Force.

In 2014 Hayward moved to Treviso, Italy, to play for Benetton Rugby until 2021 season.

International career
Hayward had been included in a 24-strong squad for a four-day national sevens camp in Mt Maunganui. It was the first of two before Tietjens named a squad of 12 for the opening tournaments of the 2007–08 IRB Sevens World Series, to be played in Dubai and South Africa in December.

On 18 August 2019, he was named in the final 31-man squad for the 2019 Rugby World Cup. and he represented Italy on 27 occasions with 5 points, from 2017 to 2020.

References

External links
 Western Force Player Profile
 Scrum profile
 itsrugby.co.uk profile

1987 births
New Zealand rugby union players
New Zealand Māori rugby union players
Highlanders (rugby union) players
Hurricanes (rugby union) players
Western Force players
Taranaki rugby union players
Rugby union centres
Rugby union players from Hāwera
New Zealand expatriate rugby union players
Expatriate rugby union players in Australia
Expatriate rugby union players in Italy
New Zealand expatriate sportspeople in Australia
New Zealand expatriate sportspeople in Italy
Living people
Benetton Rugby players
Italian rugby union players
Italy international rugby union players
Rugby union fullbacks
Rugby union wings